Tynkkynen is a Finnish surname. Notable people with the surname include:

 Leo Tynkkynen (1934–1971), Finnish speed skater
 Oras Tynkkynen (born 1977), Finnish politician
 Sebastian Tynkkynen (born 1989), Finnish politician

Finnish-language surnames